Mecum is a surname. Notable people with the surname include:

Dudley Mecum (1896–1978), American pianist, vocalist, and songwriter
Will Mecum, American musician

See also
Mecum Auctions, a company that specializes in vehicle auctions